Roland Isaacs (born January 16, 1957) is an American former professional stock car racing driver. He was a part-time fixture in the sport from 2001 to 2005, competing in the NASCAR Craftsman Truck Series, as well as one race in the Busch Series in 2004.

Racing career
Isaacs' first stock car start came in the ARCA Permatex SuperCar Series race at Salem Speedway in 1988, where he finished 35th.
He then made 3 NASCAR Southeast Series starts, one each in 1995, 1996, and 1997, and all of them at Louisville Motor Speedway. His best finish was 5th in 1996.

Isaacs made his Truck debut in 2001, with a one-race deal with Troxell Racing. He started the race at ORP in 30th position, but slid to 35th in the rundown after a rear end gear failed early in the event. Returning to the merged Troxell-MacDonald Racing team for the 2003 season, Isaacs ran nine races for the low-budget team. His best finish on the year ended up being a trio of 30ths at Memphis, Nashville and Phoenix. He would finish the year 38th in the points, his best career showing.

Isaacs also made one career NASCAR Busch Series start, which came in 2004. He drove a second MacDonald Motorsports Chevy, the No. 71, at Pikes Peak. Qualifying in the 29th position, Isaacs only completed 17 laps before starting and parking and would finish 37th.

Isaacs' last start in the Truck Series and NASCAR came in 2005 for Mighty Motorsports at Memphis. Isaacs started and finished in the 36th position, as electrical issues sidelined him early.

Motorsports career results

NASCAR
(key) (Bold – Pole position awarded by qualifying time. Italics – Pole position earned by points standings or practice time. * – Most laps led.)

Busch Series

Craftsman Truck Series

ARCA Permatex SuperCar Series
(key) (Bold – Pole position awarded by qualifying time. Italics – Pole position earned by points standings or practice time. * – Most laps led.)

References

External links
 

1957 births
Living people
NASCAR drivers
ARCA Menards Series drivers
People from La Grange, Kentucky
Racing drivers from Kentucky